Cabannes is a lunar impact crater that lies in the southern hemisphere on the far side of the Moon. The rim has been worn by subsequent impacts, with a smaller crater overlying the southern rim. However the formation has not been significantly reshaped by nearby craters.

The satellite crater Cabannes J is attached to the southeast rim, and lies between Cabannes and the heavily impacted crater Berlage. Just to the east is the crater Bellinsgauzen, and to the south is the large walled plain Antoniadi.

Satellite craters
By convention these features are identified on lunar maps by placing the letter on the side of the crater midpoint that is closest to Cabannes.

References

External links
 

Impact craters on the Moon